MTV Full Tank was a music, culture and travel show that was developed in Australia by MTV producers Gavin Jarratt and Tim Thatcher with Ean Thorley (Executive Producer). Casing the many events and lifestyles of states around Australia. The show has so far travelled around all of Australia.

Overseas
MTV Full Tank (Australia) has also ventured to Tokyo, Japan for the Fuji Rock Festival and USA for South By South West .

International Versions

New Zealand
When Viacom announced that MTV would launch a new channel in New Zealand MTV Full Tank became one of the first original programmes to air on the channel taking viewers around the country, its first destination being North Island.

Destinations

Australia
 Alice Springs
 Brisbane
 Byron Bay
 Casino
 Gold Coast
 Goulburn
 Melbourne
 Nimbin
 Sunshine Coast
 Sydney
 Overseas
 Tokyo, Japan
 Austin, TX. USA

New Zealand
 Aotearoa
 North Island

References

External links
 Official Full Tank Australia Website

MTV original programming
2005 Australian television series debuts
Australian music television series
2000s Australian reality television series
New Zealand music television series